Downe Township is a township in Cumberland County, in the U.S. state of New Jersey. It is part of the Vineland-Bridgeton metropolitan statistical area for statistical purposes. As of the 2020 United States census, the township's population was 1,399, a decrease of 186 (−11.7%) from the 2010 census count of 1,585, which in turn reflected decline of 46 (−2.8%) from the 1,631 counted in the 2000 census.

What is now Downe Township was formed by Royal charter on January 19, 1748, as Downes Township, from portions of Fairfield Township. Downe Township was incorporated as one of New Jersey's initial 104 townships by an act of the New Jersey Legislature on February 21, 1798. Portions of the township were taken to form Commercial Township on February 27, 1874. Downe Township is a dry township where alcohol is not allowed to be sold by law.

Geography
According to the U.S. Census Bureau, Downe Township had a total area of 54.26 square miles (140.54 km2), including 48.40 square miles (125.36 km2) of land and 5.86 square miles (15.18 km2) of water (10.80%).

Unincorporated communities, localities and place names located partially or completely within the township include Beadons Point, Beaver Dam, Dividing Creek, Dragston, Egg Island Point, False Egg Island Point, Fortescue, Gandys Beach, Little Neck, Money Island (surrounded by the Gandy's Beach nature preserve), Nantuxent Point, Newport, Newport Landing, Newport Neck, Newport Station, Shaws Mill, The Glades and Turkey Point.

Fortescue was once known as the "weakfish capital of the world", though the population of the fish has sharply declined, sharply impacting the economic vitality of the area.

The township borders the Cumberland County municipalities of Commercial Township, Lawrence Township and Millville, along with the Delaware Bay.

Demographics

2010 census

The Census Bureau's 2006–2010 American Community Survey showed that (in 2010 inflation-adjusted dollars) median household income was $45,250 (with a margin of error of +/− $5,437) and the median family income was $49,471 (+/− $9,499). Males had a median income of $36,739 (+/− $5,543) versus $32,841 (+/− $8,768) for females. The per capita income for the borough was $20,428 (+/− $2,019). About 6.7% of families and 14.9% of the population were below the poverty line, including 16.5% of those under age 18 and 13.0% of those age 65 or over.

2000 census
As of the 2000 U.S. census, there were 1,631 people, 658 households, and 438 families residing in the township. There were 1,134 housing units at an average density of 22.3 per square mile (8.6/km2). The racial makeup of the township was 91.05% White, 4.84% African American, 1.47% Native American, 0.18% Asian, 0.98% from other races, and 1.47% from two or more races. Hispanic or Latino of any race were 3.37% of the population.

There were 658 households, out of which 26.6% had children under the age of 18 living with them, 51.1% were married couples living together, 10.3% had a female householder with no husband present, and 33.3% were non-families. 27.4% of all households were made up of individuals, and 14.3% had someone living alone who was 65 years of age or older.  The average household size was 2.48 and the average family size was 3.03.

In the township, the population was spread out, with 23.5% under the age of 18, 6.3% from 18 to 24, 24.2% from 25 to 44, 27.0% from 45 to 64, and 18.9% who were 65 years of age or older. The median age was 42 years. For every 100 females, there were 107.8 males.  For every 100 females age 18 and over, there were 96.7 males.

The median income for a household in the township was $34,667, and the median income for a family was $39,375. Males had a median income of $35,000 versus $26,397 for females. The per capita income for the township was $17,366.  About 11.5% of families and 13.1% of the population were below the poverty line, including 21.1% of those under age 18 and 14.4% of those age 65 or over.

Government

Local government
Downe Township is governed under the Township form of New Jersey municipal government, one of 141 municipalities (of the 564) statewide that use this form, the second-most commonly used form of government in the state. The Township Committee is comprised of five members, who are elected directly by the voters at-large in partisan elections to serve three-year terms of office on a staggered basis, with either one or two seats coming up for election each year as part of the November general election in a three-year cycle. At an annual reorganization meeting, the Township Committee selects one of its members to serve as Mayor and another to serve as Deputy Mayor.

, members of the Downe Township Committee are Mayor Robert Campbell (R, term on committee ends December 31, 2024; term as mayor ends 2022), Deputy Mayor Michael Rothman (R, term on committee and as deputy mayor ends 2022), Edward Bart (R, 2023), Steven J. Burt (R, 2022) and Stephen Byrne (R, 2023).

Federal, state and county representation 
Downe Township is located in the 2nd Congressional District and is part of New Jersey's 1st state legislative district. Prior to the 2011 reapportionment following the 2010 Census, Downe Township had been in the 3rd state legislative district.

Politics
As of March 2011, there were a total of 1,128 registered voters in Downe Township, of which 249 (22.1%) were registered as Democrats, 484 (42.9%) were registered as Republicans and 394 (34.9%) were registered as Unaffiliated. There was one voter registered to another party.

In the 2012 presidential election, Republican Mitt Romney received 58.8% of the vote (415 cast), ahead of Democrat Barack Obama with 39.1% (276 votes), and other candidates with 2.1% (15 votes), among the 715 ballots cast by the township's 1,172 registered voters (9 ballots were spoiled), for a turnout of 61.0%. In the 2008 presidential election, Republican John McCain received 56.7% of the vote (447 cast), ahead of Democrat Barack Obama, who received 38.1% (300 votes), with 788 ballots cast among the township's 1,127 registered voters, for a turnout of 69.9%. In the 2004 presidential election, Republican George W. Bush received 59.1% of the vote (445 ballots cast), outpolling Democrat John Kerry, who received 38.9% (293 votes), with 753 ballots cast among the township's 1,071 registered voters, for a turnout percentage of 70.3.

In the 2013 gubernatorial election, Republican Chris Christie received 73.4% of the vote (353 cast), ahead of Democrat Barbara Buono with 23.5% (113 votes), and other candidates with 3.1% (15 votes), among the 502 ballots cast by the township's 1,072 registered voters (21 ballots were spoiled), for a turnout of 46.8%. In the 2009 gubernatorial election, Republican Chris Christie received 51.7% of the vote (306 ballots cast), ahead of both Democrat Jon Corzine with 31.9% (189 votes) and Independent Chris Daggett with 9.8% (58 votes), with 592 ballots cast among the township's 1,127 registered voters, yielding a 52.5% turnout.

Education
The Downe Township School District serves public school students in pre-kindergarten through eighth grade at Downe Township School. As of the 2018–19 school year, the district, comprised of one school, had an enrollment of 186 students and 17.0 classroom teachers (on an FTE basis), for a student–teacher ratio of 10.9:1. In the 2016–17 school year, Downe had the 38th smallest enrollment of any school district in the state, with 185 students.

Public school students in ninth through twelfth grades attend Bridgeton High School in Bridgeton, as part of a sending/receiving relationship with the Bridgeton Public Schools. As of the 2018–19 school year, the high school had an enrollment of 1,404 students and 112.0 classroom teachers (on an FTE basis), for a student–teacher ratio of 12.5:1.

Students are also eligible to attend Cumberland County Technology Education Center in Vineland, serving students from the entire county in its full-time technical training programs, which are offered without charge to students, paid for by tax dollars of those who are county residents.

Transportation

County Route 553 and County Route 555 are the main roads serving Downe Township.

References

External links

Downe Township web site

 
1748 establishments in New Jersey
Populated places established in 1748
Township form of New Jersey government
Townships in Cumberland County, New Jersey